Geoffrey O'Brien (born 1948 New York City, New York) is an American poet, editor, book and film critic, translator, and cultural historian. In 1992, he joined the staff of the Library of America as executive editor, becoming editor-in-chief in 1998.

Biography
O'Brien was born in New York City and grew up in Great Neck, Long Island. His mother, Margaret O'Brien, née Owens, was a theater actress, and his father was Joseph O'Brien, one of the original WMCA Good Guys.

O'Brien began publishing poetry and criticism in the 1960s. He has been a contributor to Artforum, Film Comment, The New York Times and The New York Times Book Review, Village Voice, New Republic, Bookforum, and, especially, to the New York Review of Books. He has also been published in numerous other publications, including Filmmaker, American Heritage, The Armchair Detective, Bomb, Boston Globe, Fence, GQ, The Los Angeles Times Book Review, Men’s Vogue, Mother Jones, The Nation, Newsday, and Slate, and has contributed many essays for liner notes for The Criterion Collection. In addition, his work has been included in numerous anthologies.

He has served as editor of The Reader's Catalog (1987–1991), a faculty member of The Writing Program at The New School, a contributing editor at Open City, and was a member of the selection committee for The New York Film Festival in 2003.

Literary style
Erudite but playful, O’Brien’s style as an essayist and reviewer is unique. Highly associative in approach, his dense, highbrow prose is often brought to bear upon the worlds of low-budget exploitation films and pulp fiction as well as more upscale and respectable venues of the cinematic, theater, literary, or popular music worlds. These wide-ranging pieces have been described as idiosyncratic “prose poems”  and tend towards partial autobiography in which he recollects youthful experiences as reader or viewer which — although they may or may not have been shared by his own readership — can lead deeply into unexpected aspects of the material at hand.

Awards and accolades
 1988 Whiting Award
 1994 Finalist, National Book Critics Circle Award (Criticism)
 1998 Fellow, New York Institute for the Humanities
 1999 Fellow, John Simon Guggenheim Memorial Foundation
 2002 Fellow, Rockefeller Foundation, Bellagio Study Center, Italy
 2011 Fellow, Bosch Public Policy Prize, American Academy in Berlin

Books

Reviews and cultural criticism
   (reprint 1997)
  (reprint Counterpoint Press, 2002)

O'Brien, Geoffrey (1998), Bardic Deadlines: Reviewing Poetry 1984–1995, University of Michigan Press.
     (reprint Counterpoint Press, 2003)
O'Brien, Geoffrey (2001), Doing It: Five Performing Arts, New York Review of Books (One of 5 authors)

 (Paperback title: Sonata for Jukebox: An Autobiography of My Ears, Counterpoint Press, 2005)

History
O'Brien, Geoffrey (2010), The Fall of the House of Walworth: Madness and Murder in Gilded Age America, Henry Holt.

Poetry
O'Brien, Geoffrey (1983), Maciste in the valley of the Pagans, Three Bears.

O'Brien, Geoffrey (2015), In a Mist

Anthology contributor

Editor
The Reader's Catalog: An Annotated Listing of the 40,000 Best Books in Print in Over 300 Categories (1989; Second Edition, 1997)
 American Poetry: The Twentieth Century, The Library of America, 2000
Volume One: Henry Adams to Dorothy Parker
Volume Two: E.E. Cummings to May Swenson

 Bartlett, John.  Bartlett's Familiar Quotations, editions 18th (2012) and 19th (2022)

References

External links
Profile at The Whiting Foundation
 Geoffrey O'Brien's poem "Six Political Criteria" in Gulf Coast: A Journal of Literature and Fine Arts (24.1).
"Geoffrey O’Brien", Luc Sante, BOMB 65/Fall 1998

1948 births
Living people
American essayists
American film critics
American humanists
American literary critics
American male essayists
American male journalists
American male poets
Journalists from New York City
The New York Review of Books people